This article details Toulouse Olympique rugby league football club's 2021 season. This was Toulouse's fourth consecutive season in the Championship.

RFL Championship

2021 Championship

Player appearances

2021 transfers

Gains

Losses

References

External links 
 Official website

Toulouse Olympique
2021 in French rugby league